Sharda  is a 1942 Bollywood film directed by Abdur Rashid Kardar. It starred Mehtab, Amir Banu, Nirmala Devi and Wasti. The film focuses on the importance of girls' education. It was the first prominent work of the music composer Naushad. Suraiya lent her voice to the film as playback singer when she was just twelve years old. The film was remade as Salma in 1960.

Cast 

 Mehtab
 Ulhas
 Nirmala Devi
 Wasti
 Badri Prasad
 Amir Banu
 Shyam Kumar

References

External links
 

1942 films
1940s Hindi-language films
Films directed by A. R. Kardar
Indian drama films
1942 drama films
Indian black-and-white films
Hindi-language drama films